Lecithocera indigens is a species of moth of the family Lecithoceridae. It is found in Yunnan in China and in Taiwan.

The wingspan is 14–16 mm.

External links
Lecithoceridae (Lepidoptera) of Taiwan (II): Subfamily Lecithocerinae: Genus Lecithocera Herrich-Schäffer and Its Allies

Moths described in 1914
indigens